Supra may refer to:
Supra (feast), an important part of Georgian social culture
Toyota Supra, a sports car/grand tourer produced from 1978 to 2002, and then since 2019
Supra (footwear brand)
Sydney University Postgraduate Representative Association
Supra Corporation, best known as a manufacturer of computer modems
Supra (grammar), Latin for "above"
Toronto Supra, a former soccer team in Toronto, Canada
Montreal Supra, a former soccer team in Montreal, Canada